Makoto Mimura (三村 真, born March 30, 1989) is a Japanese football player.

Club statistics
Updated to end of 2018 season.

References

External links

1989 births
Living people
Takushoku University alumni
Association football people from Okayama Prefecture
Japanese footballers
J2 League players
Fagiano Okayama players
Association football forwards